Rio Grande da Serra (Great River of the Mountain Chain) is a municipality in the state of São Paulo in Brazil. It is part of the Metropolitan Region of São Paulo. The population is 51,436 (2020 est.) in an area of 36.34 km2.

History

Early period
The earliest date recorded in the history of Rio Grande da Serra is May 26, 1560 when land was allotted in Jeribatiba, the third village developed by the Jesuits. To meet local needs, salt had to be brought from the port of São Vicente up to the Alto da Serra highlands via the village now known as Paranapiacaba. In 1640, the Marquês de Alegretti officially renamed Jeribatiba "Rio Grande". The mode of transport was donkeys during that period and Mogi das Cruzes, founded in 1640, rapidly became the largest settlement. Salt was transported along the so-called Caminho do Mar (sea road) to Alto da Serra, also locally known as Zanzaláh. One of the Jesuits who died on this route was buried with a wooden cross which in 1611 was converted into a chapel, now known as the Capela de São Sebastião.

Nineteenth century
In 1840, General Antônio Manuel de Melo built a ranch on the road from Mogi das Cruzes to São Paulo. In 1855, a cholera epidemic caused devastation in the region.

Until the nineteenth century, the inhabitants had been engaged in pastoral activities. On February 16, 1867, the São Paulo Railway reached Rio Grande, enabling coffee beans and timber to be transported to São Paulo. As a result, the development of Rio Grande boomed, However. it also resulted in the influx of expatriates mostly from England who established a new town at Paranapiacaba, a few miles away. The railroad encouraged the development of coal mining from 1880 and by 1895, that of manganese and graphite extraction and as well as mineral water. Expatriates from Italy, Germany and Switzerland came to work at Rio Grande from 1899 onwards.

History
Work on the canalization of the Rio Grande river was initiated in 1906. In 1918, graphite industry was established. 1920 marked the first telephone connection. In 1927, São Paulo municipality acquired Pedreira, a suburb of Rio Grande, bringing new factories with opportunities for employment. In 1928, an electric power station was built. Between 1930 and 1954 many small scale industries, extensive housing facilities, marketing centers and factories manufacturing all types of goods were set up. Schools, sports centers, musical events, carnivals and religious festivals emerged. After all these developments the town, Rio Grande da Serra, was given the status of municipality in 1964. Population growth in Rio Grande da Serra was slow until the mid-1970s, when there was an influx of migrants, mostly miners which has lasted until today, although the increase is now falling.

Geography

Rio Grande da Serra is one of the 39 municipalities (Prefeituras) in the state of São Paulo under the federal government of Brazil.
 Under the Greater ABC region, its neighboring municipalities are Santo André, Ribeirão Pires and Suzano. With the city of São Paulo and the municipalities of Diadema, Mauá, Ribeirão Pires, Santo André, São Bernardo do Campo and São Caetano do Sul, it forms part of the Microregion of São Paulo. The principal road is SP-122 (Rodovia Deputado Antônio Adib Chammas), which links to Ribeirão Pires and Paranapiacaba. Paranapiacaba is a historical site approached by road (15 minutes drive) from Rio Grande da Serra, which has train link with Luz Station (Estaco da Luz) in São Paulo. The nearest international airport is the Cumbica at Guarulhos which is quite far from the city of São Paulo.

It is named after Asa White Kenney Billings, the United States hydroelectric engineer who was instrumental in building it. The reservoir supplies about 1.8 million people, and also is used for fishing and swimming. In addition to Rio Grande da Serra and São Paulo, the Billings sub-basin includes Diadema, Ribeirao Pires, Santo Andre, and Sao Bernardo do Campo. Besides the Rio Grande and Billings Reservoir and dam, the municipality has a lot of streams and creeks, such as the streams of Figueira, Cloro, and Piolzinho.

Within the city limits, the forests areas and wetlands are stated to be well conserved, including wild animals and birds. Its rainforests are also protected under suitable environmental laws.

Climate
The climate of the city, and across the Metropolitan Region of São Paulo, is subtropical. Summers are hot and rainy, winters are mild, with a constant haze between May and October. The average annual temperature is around 18 °C, with the coldest month being July (average 14 °C) and the hottest in February (average 22 °C). Annual rainfall is around 1,400 mm.

Demography
The population of the municipal town is 44,000, which over an area of  gives a population density of 1,198 inhabitants /km2. Its Human Development growth Index (HDI) is reported to be 0.764. The rate of Infant Mortality is 18.38 per thousand inhabitants and life expectancy is 74 years. The urbanization rate is reported to be 10%.

Economy
The city's economy is dependent on ecotourism, family farming, intensive farming, cooperatives and small non-polluting industries. Fishing is practiced on the Billings Reservoir. However, the issue of disposal of city waste water and sewerage directly into the reservoir from the city is still an issue needing a solution.

Economic activities in the form of small-scale craft industries in wood craft, dehydration of leaves, among others, sculptures, fabric dolls, decorated boxes, ornaments, jewelry, paintings, artifacts from recycled material have also provided job opportunities to some artisans. The southeast on the road to Paranapiacaba is a large industrial complex. A quarry began operations in 1927; the railway communications enabled fast shipment of mined material. In 1931, the city of São Paulo signed an agreement with Light & Power to provide energy and extend the operation of the quarry.

Notable landmarks
Capela de São Sebastião was established in 1611. It is a white-washed structure in the colonial style. In 1906, a sculpture of Saint Sebastian was added to the church. The distinctive light blue and white Our Lady of Grace Chapel (Igreja Nossa Senhora das Graças), accessed via a steep flight of steps, was established in 1949. The church has its feast day on November 27. Estação Ferroviária, the railway station was inaugurated on 18 February 1867. Casa dos Castelucci and Casa família Rago are notable houses in the town.

Education
The town is served by several schools, including:
 State School Prof. Francisco Lourenco de Melo - Vila Tsuzuki
 State School Luiz Edmundo de Nobrega Teixeira - Santa Tereza
 State School Prof. Sebastião Vayego de Carvalho - Vila Conde
 Escola Estadual Padre Giuseppe Pisoni - Vila Lopes
 State School Teacher Alziro Barbosa Nascimento - Vila St John 
 Lucas Antonio State School - New Horizon
 State School Poet Cora Coralina - America Park
 Roberto Carlos Guariento State School - Vila Niwa

Gallery

References

External links

Official site 

Municipalities in São Paulo (state)